, better known by her stage name , is a Japanese voice actress from Mizuho. She was formerly with Ohsawa Jimusho, but now heads her own agency called Little Portal with husband Jin Domon. Some of her major roles are Ryo-Ohki in the Tenchi Muyo series, Yoriko Nikaidou in You're Under Arrest!, Coquelicot in Sakura Wars, Piplup in Pokémon, Tamama in Sgt. Frog, and Yōhei Yamada in Chi's Sweet Home. In video games, she is the voice of Omochao in the Sonic series and of Jibanyan in the Yo-kai Watch series.

Filmography

Anime

Film

Video games

Overseas dubbing

Discography

Drama audio recordings

Awards

References

Further reading
 Nakagami, Yoshikatsu et al. "You're Under Arrest: Full Throttle". (December 2007) Newtype USA. pp. 48–49.

External links 
  
  
 
 
 
 

1971 births
Living people
Japanese stage actresses
Japanese video game actresses
Japanese voice actresses
Seiyu Award winners
Voice actresses from Tokyo
21st-century Japanese singers
21st-century Japanese women singers